Chousa is one of the administrative divisions of Madhepura district in the Indian state of  Bihar.  The block headquarters are located at a distance of 55 km from the district headquarters, namely, Madhepura.

Geography
Chousa is located at

Panchayats
Panchayats in Chousa community development block are
Rasalpur Dhuriya
Ghausai
Chausa east
Chausa west
Arajpur east
Arajpur west
Lauwalagan east 
Lauwalagan west
Paina
Chirouri
Morsanda
Phulaut east
Phulaut west

Demographics
In the 2001 census Chousa Block had a population of 116,471.

Religious Connection

Baba Bisuraut Mela: The most historic and Culturally celebrated festival every year. Baba Bisuraut Mandir is located at Pasrasi Asthan in the village of Lauwalagan. People of Koshi belt particularly cattlemen possess high regard and value for Baba Bisuraut and Baba is considered God for cattle in the region. Every year, from 13 April, a 3-days fair (Baba Bisuraut Mela) is held which famous across all the district of Bihar and adjoining states. Visiters and Traders from Nepal also take part this fair.   

Muharram Mela: The most solemn and colourful Muslim function held in chousa organised by Muslim Community. Various plays and drama are held which is enjoyed all sections of society.

Durga pooja festival is celebrated by the people of Chousa. Previously it was managed by Lakhi Ram (Ex Congress President).

These Days Durga puja is being celebrated by the common people of chousa. There are three places in chousa for celebrate the festivals annually.

One of the most Festival that is 'Chhath' which is being celebrated in all over the Bihar, in the chousa the most popular place for this festival is 
a Small pond near Abhiya tola in chousa east as well as near agriculture field (near chousa market & bus stand chock).

References

Community development blocks in Madhepura district